The Itneg (exonym "Tinguian" or "Tingguian") are an Austronesian ethnic group from the upland province of Abra in northwestern Luzon, in the Philippines.

Overview 
The Itneg live in the mountainous area of Abra in northwestern Luzon who descended from immigrants from Kalinga, Apayao, and the Northern Kankana-ey. They refer to themselves as Itneg, though the Spanish called them Tingguian when they came to the Philippines because they are mountain dwellers. The Tingguians are further divided into nine distinct subgroups which are the Adasen, Mabaka, Gubang, Banao, Binongon, Danak, Moyodan, Dawangan, and Ilaud.

Culture 

The Tingguians still practice their traditional ways, including wet rice and swidden farming. Socio-cultural changes started when the Spanish conquistadors ventured to expand their reach to the settlements of Abra. The Spaniards brought with them their culture some of which the Tangguians borrowed. More changes in their culture took place with the coming of the Americans and the introduction of education and Catholic and Protestant proselytization.

Social organization 
Wealth and material possessions (such as Chinese jars, copper gongs called , beads, rice fields, and livestock) determine the social standing of a family or person, as well as the hosting of feasts and ceremonies. Despite the divide of social status, there is no sharp distinction between rich and poor. Wealth is inherited but the society is open for social mobility of the citizens by virtue of hard work. Shamans are the only distinct group in their society, but even then it is only during ceremonial periods.

The  are chosen for their wisdom and eagerness to protect the community's interest. Justice is governed by custom and trial by ordeal. Head-hunting was finally stopped through peace pacts.

Marriage 
The Itnegs’ marriage are arranged by the parents and are usually between distant relatives in order to keep the family close-knit and the family wealth within the kinship group. The parents select a bride for their son when he is six to eight years old, and the proposal is done to the parents of the girl. If accepted, the engagement is sealed by tying beads around the girl's waist as a sign of engagement. A bride price is also paid to the bride's family, with an initial payment and the rest during the actual wedding. No celebration accompanies the Itneg wedding and the guests leave right after the ceremony.

Clothing 
The women dress in a wrap-around skirt that reaches to the knees and fastened by an elaborately decorated belt. They also wear short sleeved jacket on special occasions. The men, on the other hand, wear a G-string made of woven cloth. On special occasions, the men also wear a long-sleeved jacket. They also wear a belt where they fasten their knife and a bamboo hat with a low, dome-shaped top. Beads are the primary adornment of the Tingguians and a sign of wealth.

Housing 
The Tingguians have two general types of housing. The first is a 2–3 room-dwelling surrounded by a porch and the other is a one-room house with a porch in front. Their houses are usually made of bamboo and cogon. A common feature of a Tingguian home with wooden floors is a corner with bamboo slats as flooring where mothers usually give birth. Spirit structures include  built during the  ceremony,  near the village entrance, and  containing jars of basi.

Tattoos 

Tattooing is commonly practiced by both men and women, who were among the most profusely tattooed ethnic groups of the Philippines.  traditions are extinct today.

Cuisine 
Rice is extensively grown by the Itneg. There are two types of practices for rice cultivation namely wet-rice cultivation and swidden/kaingin. Corn is also planted as a major subsistence and as a replacement for rice. Other products consumed are camote, yams, coconut, mango, banana and vegetables. Sugarcane is planted to make wine usually consumed during traditional rituals and ceremonies. Pigs and chickens are consumed for food or for religious rituals while carabaos are killed during large celebrations. Hunting wild animals and fishing is also prevalent. Eel and other freshwater fish such as paleleng and ladgo (lobster) are caught to make viands for most families.

Weapons 
The Tingguians use weapons for hunting, headhunting, and building a house, among others. Some examples of their weapons and implements are the lance or spear, shield, head axe. Foremost among all these weapons and implements is the bolo which the Tangguians are rarely seen without.

Language 

The native Itneg language is a South-Central Cordilleran dialect continuum.

Indigenous Itneg religion

The Itnegs believe in the existence of numerous supernatural powerful beings. They believe in spirits and deities, the greatest of which they believe to be Kadaklan who lives up in the sky and who created the earth, the moon, the stars, and the sun. The Itnegs believe in life after death, which is in a place they call . The corpse is placed in a death chair during the wake.

Immortals

Bagatulayan: the supreme deity who directs the activities of the world, including the celestial realms referred also as the Great Anito
Gomayen: mother of Mabaca, Binongan, and Adasin
Mabaca: one of the three founders of the Tinguian's three ancient clans; daughter of Gomayen and the supreme deity
Binongan: one of the three founders of the Tinguian's three ancient clans; daughter of Gomayen and the supreme deity
Adasin: one of the three founders of the Tinguian's three ancient clans; daughter of Gomayen and the supreme deity
Emlang: servant of the supreme deity
Kadaklan: deity who is second in rank; taught the people how to pray, harvest their crops, ward off evil spirits, and overcome bad omens and cure sicknesses
Apadel (Kalagang): guardian deity and dweller of the spirit-stones called pinaing
Init-init: the god of the sun married to the mortal Aponibolinayen; during the day, he leaves his house to shine light on the world
Gaygayoma: the star goddess who lowered a basket from heaven to fetch the mortal Aponitolau, who she married
Bagbagak: father of Gaygayoma
Sinang: mother of Gaygayoma
Takyayen: child of Gaygayoma and Aponitolaul popped out between Gaygayoma's last two fingers after she asked Aponitolau to prick there
Makaboteng: the god and guardian of deer and wild hogs

Mortals

Aponibolinayen: mortal spouse of the sun god, Init-init
Aponitolau: mortal who was fetched by the star goddess Gaygayoma, despite him being already married

References

External links
The Tinguian: Social, Religious, and Economic Life of a Philippine Tribe by Fay-Cooper Cole at Project Gutenberg
Traditions of the Tinguian: a Study in Philippine Folk-Lore by Fay-Cooper Cole at Project Gutenberg

Igorot